Richard Thomas Shrimpton (29 January 1910 – 5 December 1979) was a British boxer who competed in the 1936 Summer Olympics. In 1936 he was eliminated in the second round of the middleweight class after losing his fight to the upcoming silver medalist Henry Tiller.

External links
Richard Shrimpton's profile at the UK Olympic Committee
Richard Shrimpton's profile at Sports Reference.com

1910 births
1979 deaths
Middleweight boxers
Olympic boxers of Great Britain
Boxers at the 1936 Summer Olympics
British male boxers